"Heaven in Your Eyes" is a song recorded by Canadian rock band Loverboy for the soundtrack to the film Top Gun. It later appeared on Loverboy's 1989 hits compilation Big Ones. The power ballad reached No. 12 on the Billboard Hot 100 chart in the U.S.

The song was originally written by Mae Moore and John Dexter, both Vancouver-area musicians. As recorded, it is credited to Moore, Dexter and Paul Dean & Mike Reno from Loverboy.

Cash Box called it a "powerful, emotional rock ballad."  Billboard called it a "routine power ballad."

Noteworthy is the fact that Loverboy keyboardist Doug Johnson does not appear in the song's music video.  His absence was intentional, as he felt that the Top Gun film over-glamorized war and military service.

Charts

References

Loverboy songs
1986 singles
1986 songs
Songs written by Paul Dean (guitarist)
Songs written by Mike Reno
Columbia Records singles
Rock ballads